Lagna Patrike is an Indian Kannada language television drama that premiered on Colors Kannada on 21 September 2020. The show formally came to an end in November 2020, after airing for 2 months due to poor TRP ratings.

Plot
Lagna Patrike serial story was mainly focused around two youngsters Shashank and Mayuri, who were dead rivals in their professional lives. But their family members felt that they are a perfect match and decide to get them married. The story revolves how the two youngsters plot against the family members and try to cancel their wedding.

Cast
 Soorja Hoogar as Shashank
 Sanjana Burli as Mayuri
 Chaithra Kottur as Namitha
 Krishna Nadig

References 

Kannada-language television shows
2020 Indian television series debuts
2020 Indian television series endings
Colors Kannada original programming